The Warhawk Air Museum is an aviation museum located in Nampa, Idaho.

History 
The museum was founded on 6 March 1989 by John and Sue Paul. In 2021, it announced plans for an expansion.

Collection 

 Aero S-106
 Bell UH-1C Iroquois
 Cessna L-19 Bird Dog
 Curtiss Kittyhawk I
 Curtiss Kittyhawk IV
 Fokker Dr.I
 Lockheed F-104A Starfighter
 Naval Aircraft Factory N3N
 North American F-86F Sabre
 North American P-51C Mustang
 PZL-Mielec Lim-5
 Republic F-84G Thunderjet

Visiting aircraft 
In addition to the permanent collection, the museum also previously featured a number of visiting aircraft:

 Eastern FM-2 Wildcat
 Eastern TBM Avenger
 North American P-51D Mustang
 North American SNJ-6
 North American T-28A Trojan
 Piper L-4 Grasshopper
 Stearman Kaydet

Programs 
The museum participates in the Veterans History Project and hosts a series of lectures called the Kilroy Coffee Klatch.

References

External links 

 

1989 establishments in Idaho
Aerospace museums in Idaho
Museums in Canyon County, Idaho
Museums established in 1989
Military and war museums in Idaho